The Vohitra river in Alaotra-Mangoro and Atsinanana regions,  is located in central-eastern Madagascar. It drains to the eastern coast. It flows into the Rianila River near Anivorano Est. 

It has a hydro-power station at Andekaleka, the Andekaleka Dam.

References 

Rivers of Madagascar
Rivers of Alaotra-Mangoro
Rivers of Atsinanana